Touché and Go is a 1957 Warner Bros. Merrie Melodies cartoon directed by Chuck Jones. The short was released on October 12, 1957, and stars Pepé Le Pew and Penelope Pussycat.

Plot
As a street painter paints out a white line in the middle of a road, Penelope is being chased by a dog and runs right under the paint tank, getting a white line across her spine whilst the dog crashes into the tank and painter. Upset with the dog for making a mess of his work, the painter kicks the dog down the hill.

Pepé emerges from a fishing boat, scaring the boatman and sinking the boat. Pepé spies Penelope on a beach. He rushes and catches her with a few smooches while she wriggles her way out. As she scurries away, Pepé grabs her tail and rides it until he slams into a post. After a bit of daydreaming, Pepé resumes his chase.

Pepé pursues Penelope but slips on the sand and falls down a sea cliff into the sea. As Penelope reaches the rocks below, Pepé emerges, embracing her and offering to get her a glass of water. When Pepé returns with the glass of water, he finds she has run off.

Pepé finds, embraces and kisses Penelope on a boat but Penelope makes her escape in the sea with a diving mask and oxygen tank. Pepé follows, wearing a mask and flippers but no oxygen tank (being a skunk, he can hold his breath for a long time). A shark approaches and eats Pepé, but Pepé's stink makes the shark spit him out and flee on the beach.

For a long time Penelope swims under the sea until sunset where she surfaces to find a nearby island. As she removes her diving gear, she finds Pepé waiting for her. As Pepé endlessly chases Penelope, the island is revealed to be heart-shaped from birdseye view.

Music
 I've Been Working on the Railroad by Traditional
 Alouette (song) by Traditional

References

External links

1957 films
1957 animated films
1957 short films
1950s Warner Bros. animated short films
Merrie Melodies short films
Warner Bros. Cartoons animated short films
Swimming films
Short films directed by Chuck Jones
Films scored by Milt Franklyn
Pepé Le Pew films
Films set on beaches
Films set on oceans
Films set on islands
Films with screenplays by Michael Maltese
Films produced by Edward Selzer
1950s English-language films
Penelope Pussycat films